Orlando Javier Valle Vega (born February 19, 1979), known professionally as  Chencho Corleone or simply Chencho, is a Puerto Rican singer, songwriter and record producer. He was a member of the reggaeton duo Plan B with his cousin Maldy.

Awards and nominations

References

External links 
 

Spanish-language singers
Puerto Rican singer-songwriters
1979 births
Puerto Rican singers
Pages containing links to subscription-only content
Articles with excerpts
Living people